Hadash, an acronym for HaHazit HaDemokratit LeShalom uLeShivion (abbr. ) is a left to far-left political coalition in Israel formed by the Israeli Communist Party and other leftist groups.

Background
The party was formed on 15 March 1977 when the Rakah and Non-Partisans parliamentary group changed its name to Hadash in preparation for the 1977 elections. The non-partisans included some members of the Black Panthers (several others joined the Left Camp of Israel) and other left-wing non-communist groups. Within the Hadash movement, Rakah (which was renamed Maki, a Hebrew acronym for Israeli Communist Party, in 1989) has retained its independent status.

In its first electoral test, Hadash won five seats, an increase of one on Rakah's previous four. However, in the next elections in 1981 the party was reduced to four seats. It maintained its four seats in the 1984 elections, gaining another MK when Mohammed Wattad defected from Mapam in 1988. The 1988 election resulted in another four-seat haul, though the party lost a seat when Charlie Biton broke away to establish Black Panthers as an independent faction on 25 December 1990. The 1992 elections saw the party remain at three seats.

In the 1996 elections the party ran a joint list with Balad. Together they won five seats, but split during the Knesset term, with Hadash reduced to three seats. The 1999 elections saw them maintain three seats, with Barakeh and Issam Makhoul replacing Ahmad Sa'd and Saleh Saleem.

In the 2003 elections Hadash ran on another joint list, this time with Ahmed Tibi's Ta'al. The list won three seats, but again split during the parliamentary session, leaving Hadash with two MKs, Barakeh and Makhoul.

In the 2006 elections Hadash won three seats, with Hana Sweid and Dov Khenin entering the Knesset alongside Barakeh. The party won an additional seat in the 2009 elections, taken by Afu Agbaria.

In January 2015, former Knesset speaker Avraham Burg joined Hadash.

Policies and ideology

Hadash is a left-wing party that supports a socialistic economy and workers' rights. It emphasizes Jewish–Arab cooperation, and its leaders were among the first to support a two-state solution. Its voters are principally middle class and secular Arabs, many from the north and Christian communities. It also draws 6,000–10,000 far-left Jewish voters during national elections.

The party supports evacuation of all Israeli settlements, a complete withdrawal by Israel from all territories occupied as a result of the Six-Day War, and the establishment of a Palestinian state in those territories. It also supports the right of return or compensation for Palestinian refugees. In addition to issues of peace and security, Hadash is also known for being active on social and environmental issues. In keeping with socialist ideals, Hadash's environmental platform, led by Maki official Dov Khenin, calls for the nationalization of Israel's gas, mineral, and oil reserves.

Hadash defines itself as a non-Zionist party, originally in keeping with Marxist opposition to nationalism. It calls for recognition of Palestinian Arabs as a national minority within Israel. Despite its Marxist–Leninist roots, Hadash has in recent times included elements of Arab nationalism in its platform.

Hadash shifted to a more Arab nationalist appeal after running on a joint list with Ta'al in 2003. Avirama Golan of Haaretz wrote in 2007 that Hadash had "succumbed to the separatist-nationalist and populist stream ... and chosen to turn its back on a social and civil agenda in favor of questions related to Palestinian nationalism...."

In 2015, Hadash declared its support for international campaigns against companies operating in the occupied Palestinian territories.

Election platform
The party's platform for the 2009 elections consisted of:
 Achieving a just, comprehensive, and stable peace: Israeli/Palestinian and Israeli/Arab
 Protecting workers' rights and issues
 Developing social services: health, education, housing, welfare, culture, and sports
 Equality for the Arab population in Israel
 Eradicating ethnic discrimination in all fields; defending the concerns of residents of disadvantaged neighborhoods and development towns
 Protecting democratic freedoms
 Equality between the sexes in all fields
 Protecting the environment; environmental justice
 Eradicating weapons of mass destruction

Controversy
On 1 November 2009, then party leader Mohammad Barakeh was indicted on four counts for events that occurred between April 2005 and July 2007; assault and interfering with a policeman in the line of duty, assault on a photographer, insulting a public servant, and for attacking an official who was discharging his legal duty. The charges related to his role in a protest against Israeli government policy, and was considered controversial mainly by those who were opposed to such protests.

In December 2015, the Hadash party published a Facebook post condemning the assassination of Hezbollah militant Samir Kuntar and comparing Israeli Prime Minister Benjamin Netanyahu to the Islamic State of Iraq and Syria.

Election results

Leaders
Meir Vilner chairman (1976–1992)
Tawfiq Ziad chairman (1992–1994)
Saleh Saleem chairman (1996–1999)
Tawfik Toubi, secretary-general (1989–1993)
Mohammad Barakeh, secretary-general (1993–1999), chairman (1999–2015)
Ayman Odeh, secretary-general (2006–present), chairman (2015–present)

References

External links

Official website 
Hadash Knesset website

Communist parties in Israel
Political party alliances in Israel
Marxist parties in Israel
Political parties established in 1977
Socialist parties in Israel
1977 establishments in Israel